Andrey Yuryevich Mitkovets (born September 25, 1974) is a Kyrgyzstani sprint canoer who has competed in the mid-1990s. At the 1996 Summer Olympics in Atlanta, he was eliminated in the repechages of both the K-2 500 m and the K-2 1000 m event.

References

External links
 
Sports-Reference.com profile

1974 births
Canoeists at the 1996 Summer Olympics
Kyrgyzstani male canoeists
Living people
Kyrgyzstani people of Russian descent
Olympic canoeists of Kyrgyzstan
Canoeists at the 1994 Asian Games
Canoeists at the 1998 Asian Games
Asian Games competitors for Kyrgyzstan